Heath Voss (born February 17, 1978) is an American former professional motocross racer. He competed in the AMA Motocross Championships from 1996 to 2010. Voss was born in Prior Lake, Minnesota, and is notable for winning the 2004 Fédération Internationale de Motocyclisme Supercross world championship.

After retiring from motocross racing, Voss started a helicopter charter business flying hunters to remote locations.

References

1978 births
Living people
People from Prior Lake, Minnesota
American motocross riders